Wade, WADE, or Wades may refer to:

Places in the United States 
 Wade, California, a former settlement
 Wade, Maine, a town
 Wade, Mississippi, a census-designated place
 Wade, North Carolina, a town
 Wade, Ohio, an unincorporated community
 Wade Township, Clinton County, Illinois
 Wade Township, Jasper County, Illinois
 Wade County, Choctaw Nation, a former political subdivision
 Wades Branch, a river in Tennessee

People and figures 
 Wade (folklore), a being from Germanic mythology and folklore
 Wade (given name), a list of people and fictional characters
 Wade (surname), including a list of people and fictional characters

Other uses 
 Wade (film), a 2020 Indian animated short film
 World Alliance for Decentralized Energy (WADE)
 Wade Ceramics, manufacturers of porcelain and earthenware; known for making "Whimsies"
 WADE (AM), a radio station in Wadesboro, North Carolina, United States
 Wade–Giles, a method of Romanisation of Chinese, sometimes abbreviated as Wade
 Wade Stadium, a baseball field in Duluth, Minnesota, United States
 Wade Trophy, for the best woman basketball player in National Collegiate Athletic Association Division I
 The Wades, a British band

See also 
 Roe v. Wade, a landmark 1973 United States Supreme Court decision on the issue of abortion
 Waad (disambiguation), another form of the name